Rusk may refer to:
 Rusk, a dry biscuit, a twice-baked bread, a children's snack, a cereal binder

People
 Claude Ewing Rusk (1871-1931), author, mountaineer
 Dean Rusk (1909–1994), United States Secretary of State, 1961–1969
 Harry Welles Rusk (1852–1926), Maryland politician
 Jeremiah McLain Rusk (1830–1893), Wisconsin politician and U.S. Secretary of Agriculture (1889–1893) 
 Lycurgus J. Rusk (1851-1928), Wisconsin politician
 Simon Rusk (born 1981), Scottish footballer
 Thomas Jefferson Rusk (1803–1857), Texas military man and politician, U.S. Senator (1846–1857)

Fictional people
 Dell Rusk, U.S. Secretary of Defense, an alias of Red Skull

Places
United States
 Rusk, Indiana, an unincorporated community
 Rusk, Texas, a city in Cherokee County
 Rusk Independent School District
Rusk, West Virginia
 Rusk, Burnett County, Wisconsin, a town
 Rusk, Dunn County, Wisconsin, an unincorporated community
 Rusk, Rusk County, Wisconsin, a town
 Rusk County, Texas
 Rusk County, Wisconsin
 Rusk Mountain, a peak in the Catskill Mountains, Greene County, New York

Companies and organizations
 Rusk Incorporated, a maker of hair care products and devices
 Rusk Institute of Rehabilitation Medicine, part of New York University Medical Center; named for Dr. Howard A. Rusk

Other
 Rusk documents, diplomatic documents exchanged by the U.S. and Korea in the 1940s and 1950s
 Afroyim v. Rusk, a 1967 U.S. Supreme Court case